Felipe Silva (born 5 August 1984) is a Brazilian Muay Thai and Kickboxing champion and a mixed martial artist who fights under Brave CF in the lightweight division. A professional mixed martial artist since 2013, Silva has also competed in the Ultimate Fighting Championship (UFC).

Background 
Silva began in the combat sport of Muay Thai and he won the Brazilian Muay Thai Championship twice and Brazilian Kickboxing title three-time before transitioning to mixed martial arts.

Mixed martial arts career

Early career 
Silva made his professional mixed martial arts debut in March 2013. He amassed a record of 7–0, competing for various regional promotions in Brazil before signed by UFC.

Ultimate Fighting Championship 
Silva made his official debut for the promotion on 27 August 2016 at UFC on Fox: Maia vs. Condit where he faced Shane Campbell. He won the fight via technical knockout in round one.

He next faced Mairbek Taisumov in September 2017 at UFC Fight Night: Struve vs. Volkov. He lost the fight via  knockout in round one.

On 19 May 2018, Silva faced Claudio Puelles at UFC Fight Night: Maia vs. Usman.  He lost the fight via a submission in round three.

Post-UFC career
After being released from the UFC, Silva signed a contract with Brave CF in May 2019. Silva was expected to make his promotional debut by headlining Brave CF 26 against Guram Kutateladze on 7 September 2019. However, Kutateladze withdrew from the bout due to an injury and was replaced by Dumar Roa. Silva won the fight via technical knockout in the first round.

Silva eventually faced Kutateladze in the rescheduled bout at Brave CF 29 on 15 November 2019, losing the back-and-forth fight in the first round via technical knockout.

In his third bout in the Brave CF, Silva faced Sam Patterson at Brave CF 41 on 17 September 2020. He lost fight via first-round knockout.

Silva faced Maciek Gierszewski on 1 April 2021 at Brave CF 50. At weigh-ins, Silva came in 3.1 pounds (1.4 kg) over the catchweight (161 lb) limit and was fined a percentage of his purse which will go to his opponent. He lost by KO in the first round.

Mixed martial arts record 

|-
| Loss
| align=center| 9–5
|Maciek Gierszewski
|KO (punches)
|Brave CF 50
|
|align=center|1
|align=center|2:28
|Arad, Bahrain
|
|-
| Loss
| align=center| 9–4
| Sam Patterson
| KO (punch)
| Brave CF 41
| 
| align=center| 1
| align=center| 2:12
| Riffa, Bahrain
|
|-
| Loss
| align=center| 9–3
| Guram Kutateladze
| TKO (punches)
| Brave CF 29
| 
| align=center| 1
| align=center| 0:44
| Isa Town, Bahrain
|
|-
| Win
| align=center| 9–2
| Dumar Roa
| TKO (punches)
| Brave CF 26
| 
| align=center| 1
| align=center| N/A
| Bogotá, Colombia
|
|-
| Loss
| align=center| 8–2
| Claudio Puelles
| Submission (kneebar)
| UFC Fight Night: Maia vs. Usman
| 
| align=center| 3
| align=center| 2:23
| Santiago, Chile
|
|- 
| Loss
| align=center| 8–1
| Mairbek Taisumov
| KO (punch)
| UFC Fight Night: Volkov vs. Struve
| 
| align=center| 1
| align=center| 1:24
| Rotterdam, Netherlands
|
|- 
| Win
| align=center| 8–0
| Shane Campbell
| TKO (punches)
| UFC on Fox 21
| 
| align=center| 1
| align=center| 1:13
| Vancouver, Canada
|
|- 
| Win
| align=center| 7–0
| Anton Kuivanen
| TKO (punches)
| Cage 35
| 
| align=center| 1
| align=center| 4:04
| Helsinki, Finland
|
|- 
| Win
| align=center| 6–0
| Carlos Irigoitia
| Submission (armbar)
| Explosion MMA 5
| 
| align=center| 1
| align=center| 0:48
| Asuncion, Paraguay
|
|- 
| Win
| align=center| 5–0
| Allan Moziel
| Decision (unanimous)
| JF Fight Evolution 14
| 
| align=center| 3
| align=center| 5:00
| Juiz de Fora, Brazil
|
|- 
| Win
| align=center| 4–0
| Kleverson Bracin
| TKO
| Face the Danger 7
| 
| align=center| 1
| align=center| N/A
| Telêmaco Borba, Brazil
|
|- 
| Win
| align=center| 3–0
| Johny Vieira
| TKO (punches)
| JF Fight Evolution 13
| 
| align=center| 1
| align=center| 3:58
| Juiz de Fora, Brazil
|
|- 
| Win
| align=center| 2–0
| Anildo Dias Jr.
| KO (knee and punches)
| Iron Fight Combat 4
| 
| align=center| 1
| align=center| 4:21
|São José dos Pinhais, Brazil
|
|- 
| Win
| align=center| 1–0
| Alexandre Baptista da Costa
| TKO (punches)
| Nitrix Champion Fight 14
| 
| align=center| 1
| align=center| 4:21
| Balneário Camboriú, Brazil
|
|-

See also 
 List of current Brave CF fighters
 List of male mixed martial artists

References

External links 
 Felipe Silva at Brave CF
 
 
 
 

1984 births
Living people
Brazilian male mixed martial artists
Lightweight mixed martial artists
Mixed martial artists utilizing Muay Thai
Mixed martial artists utilizing Brazilian jiu-jitsu
Ultimate Fighting Championship male fighters
Brazilian Muay Thai practitioners
Brazilian practitioners of Brazilian jiu-jitsu